Shinto is frequently a theme in Japanese popular culture, including film, manga, anime, and video games. Shinto religion is at the core of Japanese culture and history and as such greatly affects the outcome of pop culture in modern Japan.

Some works in Japanese or international popular culture borrow significantly from Shinto myths, deities, and beliefs. Aside from the many games, movies, manga and other cultural products that mention the religion or the names of its deities, some anime, film, video games, or other works feature Shinto elements as central elements.

Shinto itself features in popular culture as folk Shinto or Minkan Shinto.

Anime and manga
Shinto motifs and themes such as kami (gods or spirits) and yokai (ghosts or demons) are particularly present in anime and manga.

In Dream Saga, the Earth is destroyed and recreated whenever humans have polluted it. This is done when Susanoo, the Shinto god of the sea and storms, (the brother to Amaterasu) consumes Amaterasu, the sun goddess. The two main characters, Yuuki and Takaomi, are given key roles in the process.

Film
Some Japanese films feature themes from Shinto religion or characters based on kami. This is especially the case in animated films, such as Hayao Miyazaki's Princess Mononoke or Spirited Away, but can also be seen in other films.

 The Three Treasures (1959) features several gods, including Amaterasu, Izanagi and others as characters.
In the Stargate series, Amaterasu is a Goa'uld System Lord who comes to Earth with Lord Yu and Camulus to form a temporary truce between Earth and the Goa'uld.
In Little Prince and the Eight-Headed Dragon Susanoo wishes to follow his mother, Izanami, to heaven when she dies, but his father, Izanagi, tells him he cannot.

Video games

Video games may relate to themes or characters from Shinto, as well as Buddhism, Christianity, and other religions. Such games may present a heterodox or alternative take on religion, or even parody traditional practice or belief. In addition to Shinto stories or kami, themes such as the sacredness of nature or the place of magic in everyday life are also visible in such games.
In the 2006 video game Ōkami, Amaterasu is depicted as a white wolf and she is the main protagonist of the game. As in the traditional Shinto, Amaterasu is the goddess of the sun, but in the game she controls many other powers as well by painting things. This depiction of Amaterasu is also a playable character in Marvel vs. Capcom 3: Fate of Two Worlds and Ultimate Marvel vs. Capcom 3.
In 2016, Amaterasu, Raijin, Susano, Izanami, in 2017, Hachiman, and in 2020, Tsukuyomi, were included as playable characters in the multiplayer online battle arena video game Smite.
In the 2022 game Overwatch 2, a new support hero, Kiriko, was introduced into the game at release. Her overall design and abilities are heavily influenced by spiritual objects based on Shintoism. Her attire is based on the attire worn by Shinto shrine maidens and her overall design incorporates allusions to Kitsune. Her abilities are also heavily influenced by spiritual objects associated with Shintoism, such as ofuda and suzu. Later in February 2023, a skin for her based on Amaterasu, the goddess of sun in Shinto, was added into the game in the battle pass.

Theatrical plays 
Yamata Amasung Keibu Keioiba is a Meitei language play that interweaves the stories of the two legendary creatures, Yamata-no-Orochi slain by Susanoo for saving Kushinada of Shinto (Japanese folklore) and Keibu Keioiba of Meitei folklore (Manipuri folklore). In the play, the role of Yamata-no-Orochi was played by Maisnam Momocha, the role of Susanoo by Romario Thoudam Paona and the role of Kushinada by Roslin Akoijam Chanu.

Other works of popular culture
Shinto stories or kami also appear in other works of popular culture, including work set in Japan but produced outside of the country.
The Shinto deities Izanami and Izanagi (the latter incorrectly spelled as "Izaghi") appear in Puccini's opera Madama Butterfly.
The Shinto deities Izanami and Izanagi (spelled "Izanaki") appear in Natsuo Kirino's The Goddess Chronicle.
In the novel, Giles Goat-Boy, author John Barth makes reference to the people of Japan as the "Amaterasu," who were EATEN by WESCAC (a reference to the atomic bombing of Hiroshima and Nagasaki) during the "Second Campus Riot" (World War II).
Izanagi and Izanami appear as minor supporting characters in the Teenage Mutant Ninja Turtles Adventures comic book series, aiding the Turtles and their allies in battle against a powerful demon whose emergence from a damaged nuclear reactor threatens the safety of all Japan.
Several kami, including Susano-o-no-mikoto, Izanami, and Tsukuyomi, appear as supporting characters in the Vertigo Comics series Sandman and its spinoff Lucifer.

References